The 2005–06 Australian Athletics Championships was the 84th edition of the national championship in outdoor track and field for Australia. It was held from 2–5 February 2006 at the Sydney Olympic Park Athletic Centre in Sydney. It served as a selection meeting for Australia at the 2006 Commonwealth Games.

Medal summary

Men

Women

References

External links 
 Athletics Australia website

2006
Australian Athletics Championships
Australian Championships
Athletics Championships
Sports competitions in Sydney
2000s in Sydney